Łukasz Marek Fabiański (born 18 April 1985) is a Polish professional footballer who plays as a goalkeeper for  club West Ham United. He also played for the Poland national team, until his retirement in 2021.

Having begun his career at Legia Warsaw, Fabiański joined Arsenal for £2.1 million in 2007, and was mainly used as back-up, but played as the club won the 2014 FA Cup Final. On the expiration of his contract in 2014, he joined Swansea City, and played 150 total matches in four years. He then signed for West Ham for £7 million.

A full international for Poland since 2006, Fabiański represented his country on 57 occasions. He was included in the squads for the 2006 FIFA World Cup, UEFA Euro 2008, Euro 2016, the 2018 FIFA World Cup and Euro 2020.

Club career

Early career
Fabiański was born in Kostrzyn nad Odrą, Lubusz Voivodeship. After starting his career with Polonia Słubice, Fabiański joined the noted independent football academy MSP Szamotuły at age 14, where he honed his footballing skills. Fabiański then was signed in the 2004–05 season by Lech Poznań.

Legia Warsaw
In the winter of 2005, Fabiański was signed by Legia Warsaw, where he competed with Artur Boruc for a place in the team. After Boruc was sold to Celtic, Fabiański took over as starting goalkeeper on 24 July 2005 in a match against Arka Gdynia, which ended 0–0. The following season, he helped Legia win the 2005–06 Ekstraklasa. He started all 30 matches of the campaign, in which he conceded 17 goals.

In the 2005–06 and 2006–07 seasons, his performances led to him being awarded the "Football Oscar" for the best goalkeeper in the Ekstraklasa.

Arsenal
On 8 May 2007, Fabiański underwent medical tests in London after Arsenal agreed a transfer fee with Legia Warsaw worth approximately £2.1 million. The move was confirmed on 11 May 2007 by Arsenal manager Arsène Wenger. Fabiański formally signed for Arsenal on 26 May with a long-term contract. He made his debut for the club in a 2–0 League Cup win over Newcastle United on 25 September 2007. His league debut followed later that season against Derby County.

In Fabiański's early Arsenal career, two of his most notable appearances came in the 5–1 defeat to rivals Tottenham Hotspur in the 2007–08 League Cup semi-final and the first leg of the 2009–10 UEFA Champions League second round match with Porto. Fabiański received criticism for conceding soft goals in the Porto match as he scored an own goal and was blamed for the second goal after picking up a backpass from Sol Campbell, with Porto scoring from the resulting free-kick. In January 2010, Arsène Wenger stated that Łukasz Fabiański could become one of the best goalkeepers in the Premier League.

Fabiański played the last four matches for Arsenal in the 2009–10 season after top-choice goalkeeper Manuel Almunia suffered a wrist injury. He was criticised for conceding soft goals in the defeats to Wigan Athletic and Blackburn Rovers, but kept clean sheets in the matches at home to Manchester City and Fulham.

2010–11 season

Fabiański started the 2010–11 season as Arsenal's second-choice goalkeeper. On 21 September 2010, he made his first start of the season in a League Cup match against neighbours Tottenham Hotspur at White Hart Lane, which Arsenal won 4–1 after extra time. Fabiański almost cost the match for Arsenal as he failed to stop Robbie Keane's long-range effort, despite getting a hand to the shot. After the match, he revealed he was disappointed. He had a solid match in his second match of the season replacing the injured Manuel Almunia one week later in a UEFA Champions League 3–1 away win against Partizan. He saved Cléo's second penalty of the match in the second half to deny Partizan a lifeline. He later turned Ivica Iliev's effort around the post from point-blank range just before the final whistle. Arsène Wenger later commented that Fabiański had a "faultless" match and they finally saw the player who they usually see in training. He kept his first clean sheet in a win over Manchester City, where he made many saves in a match that ended 3–0. He was later named man of the match on an Arsenal.com poll after a brilliant display to keep Arsenal in the match. After the City match, Wenger admitted he could well become the club's number one goalkeeper after impressive displays in the matches since the Partizan match.

On 7 November 2010, Fabiański was widely criticised for an error that lead to the only goal as Arsenal lost at home to Newcastle United. However, he produced a strong display to keep a clean sheet in the next Premier League match, against Wolverhampton Wanderers, in which he managed to prevent a draw with a last-minute save, and then initiating a counter-attack with a long throw of the ball that led to another Arsenal goal. After the Wolves match, Arsenal played Everton, where Fabiański received the man of the match award from Sky Sports.

Fabiański was injured for Arsenal's crucial match with Manchester United but returned for the equally important match with London rivals Chelsea, making many crucial saves in helping Arsenal to win 3–1. On 5 January 2011, he suffered a season-ending shoulder injury as he was warming up with the help of Wojciech Szczęsny, which ruled him out for the remainder of the 2010–11 season. During this period, Szczęsny established himself as Arsenal's first choice goalkeeper ahead of his Polish compatriot.

2011–12 season

Fabiański spent the 2011–12 season as backup to Wojciech Szczęsny, making his first appearance against Shrewsbury Town in the League Cup.

On 6 December 2011, Fabiański was selected to start in Arsenal's UEFA Champions League group stage match against Olympiacos, but was substituted out after 25 minutes following a knee injury.

2012–13 season
Injuries limited Fabiański's appearances during the 2012–13 season, where he made only four Premier League appearances as back-up to Wojciech Szczęsny. In March 2013, after Szczęsny was dropped, Fabiański started in goal in the second-leg of Arsenal's UEFA Champions League tie against Bayern Munich. He kept a clean sheet as Arsenal won 2–0 and retained his place in the team to make his first Premier League start of the season away against Swansea City on 16 March 2013, again keeping a clean sheet in a 2–0 win. Fabiański started in Arsenal's next three league matches against Reading, West Bromwich Albion and Norwich City. However, an injury sustained in the match against Norwich by Fabiański allowed Szczęsny to return to the starting line-up and reclaim his position as first-choice goalkeeper.

2013–14 season
During the 2013–14 season, Fabiański was used as Arsenal's starting goalkeeper in FA Cup and League Cup matches, with Szczęsny remaining first-choice in Premier League and UEFA Champions League matches.

On 19 February 2014, Fabiański came on as a substitute in the 37th minute of a 2–0 Champions League home defeat against Bayern Munich, after Szczęsny was sent off for a foul on Arjen Robben. With Szczęsny suspended, Fabiański was in the starting line-up for the second leg and saved a late penalty from Bayern's Thomas Müller.

On 12 April, Fabiański saved penalties from Gary Caldwell and Jack Collison in an FA Cup semi-final shootout victory over Wigan Athletic. He made his only Premier League appearance of the season in the last match on 11 May, keeping a clean sheet in a 2–0 away win that caused his opponents Norwich City to be relegated. Six days later, Fabiański started for Arsenal in the 2014 FA Cup Final as they defeated Hull City 3–2 after extra time at Wembley Stadium.

Swansea City
On 29 May 2014, it was announced that Fabiański would join fellow Premier League side Swansea City on a free transfer when his Arsenal contract expired on 1 July. He said of the transfer, "The main reason I came to Swansea was because I want to be the number one goalkeeper." He made his competitive debut for the club on 16 August, a 2–1 win against Manchester United at Old Trafford in the first match of the Premier League season. On 7 December 2014, Fabiański was sent off in Swansea's 1–3 loss at West Ham United for a foul on Diafra Sakho.

On 11 May 2015, Fabiański kept a clean sheet and was named man of the match in a 1–0 win against Arsenal on his return to the Emirates Stadium. On 6 July, Fabiański signed a new four-year contract with Swansea, which would keep him at the club until June 2019.

Fabiański played all 38 of Swansea's Premier League games of 2017–18 and was voted Player of the Season by the club's supporters. His performances did not prevent the club from ending the season 18th and they were relegated to the Championship.

West Ham United
On 20 June 2018, Premier League club West Ham United announced the transfer of Fabiański for £7 million. He signed a three-year contract with the club. Fabiański, the first Pole to play first-team football for West Ham, was installed as first-choice 'keeper at the start of the 2018–19 season. On 4 December 2018, Fabiański saved his first penalty as a West Ham goalkeeper, saving Joe Ralls' effort in a 3–1 win against Cardiff City. For his performances throughout the season, during which he was ever-present, he was named Hammer of the Year.

In September 2019, he suffered a hip injury. During his absence, Roberto and David Martin deputised for Fabiański.

In March 2021, Fabiański extended his contract with West Ham until June 2022.

On 12 January 2022, Fabianski made his 300th Premier League appearance in a 2–0 victory over Norwich City, the first player from Poland to reach this landmark.

After having started all 24 of West Ham’s Premier League games in the 2022-23 season, on 25 February 2023 he fractured his cheekbone and eye socket in a home game against Nottingham Forest. He had to come off in the 69th minute and was replaced by Alphonse Areola.

International career

Having represented Poland regularly at under-21 level, Fabiański's performances for Legia Warsaw saw him soon making his debut for the senior international team in a friendly against Saudi Arabia on 29 March 2006.

Fabiański was included in Poland's squad for the 2006 FIFA World Cup, serving as back-up to Artur Boruc and Tomasz Kuszczak. During the qualifying campaign for the UEFA Euro 2008, he made one appearance, playing all 90 minutes in Poland's 2–2 away draw against Serbia on 21 November 2007. In September 2008, Fabiański replaced the suspended Boruc for the 2010 World Cup qualifiers against San Marino and Slovenia. He also played in another qualifying match against San Marino in April 2009. He was widely seen to be the starting goalkeeper for Poland in the UEFA Euro 2012, before an injury had him ruled out for the tournament held in his home country.

Despite going into UEFA Euro 2016 as an understudy to Wojciech Szczęsny, an injury in the first game of the tournament led to Fabiański becoming first choice for the rest of the tournament. He went on to keep clean sheets in both of the remaining group games against World champions Germany and Ukraine. He then kept his place as Poland defeated Switzerland in the Round of 16 before losing to eventual winners Portugal on penalties.

Fabiański made seven appearances for Poland in the 2018 FIFA World Cup qualifiers. He was also included in the team's squad for the 2018 FIFA World Cup finals, although Szczęsny was chosen over him to start the first two group matches, where Poland suffered losses to Senegal and Colombia. Fabiański started the final group match against Japan to make his only World Cup appearance, keeping a clean sheet in Poland's 1–0 win, which proved to be too little to prevent the team's elimination from the tournament. He was also included in Poland's squad for the UEFA Euro 2020, but made no appearances as the team suffered another early elimination after only scoring a point in their three group matches.

His international retirement was announced in August 2021. The following month, he accepted a call-up for his farewell match, a 2022 FIFA World Cup qualification fixture against San Marino on 9 October 2021. Fabiański started the game and was substituted in the 57th minute by Radosław Majecki, officially ending his international career with 57 caps.

Career statistics

Club

International

Honours
Legia Warsaw
Ekstraklasa: 2005–06

Arsenal
FA Cup: 2013–14

Individual
Best Goalkeeper of Polish Ekstraklasa: 2005–06, 2006–07
Swansea City Player of the Season: 2017–18
Polish Footballer of the Year: 2018
West Ham United Hammer of the Year: 2018–19
London Football Awards Goalkeeper Of The Year : 2021'''

References

External links

 Łukasz Fabiański at West Ham United F.C. (archive)
 
 
 
 

1985 births
Living people
People from Kostrzyn nad Odrą
Sportspeople from Lubusz Voivodeship
Polish footballers
Poland youth international footballers
Poland under-21 international footballers
Poland international footballers
Association football goalkeepers
Sparta Brodnica players
Lech Poznań players
Legia Warsaw players
Arsenal F.C. players
Swansea City A.F.C. players
West Ham United F.C. players
Ekstraklasa players
Premier League players
2006 FIFA World Cup players
UEFA Euro 2008 players
UEFA Euro 2016 players
2018 FIFA World Cup players
UEFA Euro 2020 players
Polish expatriate footballers
Expatriate footballers in England
Expatriate footballers in Wales
Polish expatriate sportspeople in England
Polish expatriate sportspeople in Wales
FA Cup Final players